"Emotional Consequences of Broadcast Television" is the series finale of the sitcom Community, serving as the thirteenth episode of its sixth season. It was written by series creator Dan Harmon and Chris McKenna, and directed by Rob Schrab. It is the 110th episode overall and was initially released on Yahoo! Screen in the United States on June 2, 2015.

In the episode, the group imagines how their next year at Greendale might look. As he hears about his friends' plans, Jeff grows concerned over what will happen to him as everyone else moves away. The episode includes many self-referential pitches for what a "season seven" of the show would look like. It also includes a cameo by former cast member Yvette Nicole Brown.

The episode received critical acclaim, with many calling it a sincere and satisfying end to the show's run, and praising the emotional weight along with the conclusion of the story. It has also been ranked among the best episodes of the entire series.

Plot
As another school year ends, Frankie (Paget Brewster) disbands the "Save Greendale Committee" for the summer. Elroy (Keith David) abruptly reveals that he was hired by LinkedIn and bids the group farewell.

The other group members head to a bar. Britta (Gillian Jacobs) asks Abed (Danny Pudi) what he thinks will happen next year in "season seven". Abed, Dean Pelton (Jim Rash), and Chang (Ken Jeong) present their season seven "pitches". During the conversation, Annie (Alison Brie) arrives. She reveals she will be moving to Washington, D.C. for a summer internship with the FBI. This causes Jeff (Joel McHale), who had resisted joining the conversation, to imagine a nightmarish future where he is the only group member left at Greendale, surrounded by other students who will also eventually leave.

Jeff, now participating, presents a pitch where Annie returns as an FBI agent. Britta and Frankie also present pitches, which are poorly received, and Abed notes that television must be "joyful, effortless, [and] fun." Jeff then presents another pitch where the group members stay at Greendale as faculty. The idea is well-received until Abed reveals that he is leaving to become a production assistant in California. In response, Jeff imagines himself strangling a series of Abed clones.

Jeff abruptly leaves and returns to the study room. He imagines a happy married life with Annie only to realize he doesn't know what Annie wants. Annie enters; Jeff confesses he wants to be young again, and Annie urges him to accept that he's older now. He admits that he loves her but acknowledges that he let her go. Annie asks him to kiss her goodbye before she potentially leaves forever. They kiss. The other group members arrive, and everyone silently imagines their own versions of "season seven". Jeff pictures himself accepting that his friends will eventually leave. He thanks the group for changing his life. In a twist, Chang surprisingly comes out as gay. Later, Jeff drops Annie and Abed off at the airport, hugging and kissing Annie goodbye and giving Abed two long hugs. Jeff rejoins the others at the bar as the screen fades to black and "#andamovie" appears on screen.

The end tag features a commercial for a fictional Community board game narrated by Dan Harmon. As a family plays the game, the son (Connor Rosen) reveals a script for the commercial itself. The dad (Wayne Federman) explains that this means they will never truly be alive. The family sits in shocked silence while Harmon delivers a fourth wall-breaking monologue about Community.

Cultural references

Chang uses Friends, The Simpsons, Seinfeld, and South Park as examples of TV shows that peaked after their sixth season. Jeff and Annie describe the Marvel Cinematic Universe films as "boring" and "flavorless" respectively, a jab at Community alumni Anthony and Joe Russo, who directed several MCU films (at the time, only Captain America: The Winter Soldier). Community actors Danny Pudi, Jim Rash, Ken Jeong, and Yvette Nicole Brown have all made cameo appearances in MCU films directed by the Russo brothers, while Donald Glover appears in Spider-Man: Homecoming. Show creator Dan Harmon also contributed to Doctor Strange. The episode's end-tag is a take on the character of Tommy Westphall in the St. Elsewhere'''s series finale, while Chuck Lorre's vanity cards are also referenced.

The song "Ends of the Earth" by Lord Huron plays during the final moments of the episode as Jeff drops Abed and Annie off at the airport.

Production
The episode was written by showrunner and creator Dan Harmon and Chris McKenna. It was directed by Rob Schrab. The opening shots of the episode, like characters exiting the building, were originally going to be used for an episode based around a fire drill.

This episode features the first and only use of explicit language on the series, spoken twice by both Dean Pelton (Jim Rash) and Britta Perry (Gillian Jacobs), in reference to the series move to Yahoo! Screen. In an interview with TV Insider, creator Dan Harmon explained how it happened:

Critical reception
The episode received critical acclaim. Joshua Alston of The A.V. Club gave the episode an "A" rating, praising that it "works so well as a series finale, and makes such a strong case for moving forward with the 'and a movie' portion of Community’s hashtagged endgame". He noted that the pitches worked well at showing off the characters' differences: "With each new version, we’re reminded of how these characters are different, what perspective they bring to the Save Greendale Committee, as well as how they see the group and what they get out of belonging to it." Eric Goldman of IGN rated the episode a 9 out of 10, praising its character development and likening it to another well-received episode, season 3's "Remedial Chaos Theory". He noted that despite the closing hashtag, "it doesn't seem Harmon and McKenna feel Season 7 is in the cards and even the movie could be doubtful" but added that "if this ends up being the final time we see these characters, it was a really well done farewell, acknowledging the important time they've spent together". Variety said the episodes was a satisfying and emotional end to the series and opined that it was "unapologetically meta", due to its frequent use of meta humour in the episode. Time relished the episode's concept for its imaginative meta humour and breaking the fourth wall using the individual characters' identities. Paste wrote that the episode was a great conclusion to the series. Both writing for Den of Geek, Mark Harrison and Joe Matar praised the episode. Darren Franich of Entertainment Weekly called it "laugh-out-loud funny".

A retrospective ranking by Entertainment Weekly'' of the show's top episodes placed the episode seventh, noting the "raw confessional quality" of the episode and calling it "one of the greatest series finales ever."

References

External links
 "Emotional Consequences of Broadcast Television" at Yahoo! Screen.com
 

2015 American television episodes
Community (season 6) episodes
American television series finales
Television episodes written by Dan Harmon